Roaring Point is a natural jetty on the Nanticoke River. Located southwest of Nanticoke, Maryland, the point is inside of Roaring Point Park.

Due to its rocky composition and length, the point is a popular spot for fishing and crabbing among the local watermen.

References

Nanticoke River